Ranaweera Appuhamilage Leslie Herbert Gunawardana (17 August 1938 – 16 November 2010) was a Sri Lankan historian, academic, politician and government minister.

Early life and family
Gunawardana was born on 17 August 1938 in Tholangamuwa, Ceylon. Both of his parents died when he was young and he was brought up his uncle. He was educated at Tholangamuwa Central College. Having won the 1956 the University Entrance Arts Scholarship, he joined the University of Ceylon, Peradeniya, graduating in 1960 with a first class B.A. honours degree in ancient history. He received a PhD degree from the School of Oriental and African Studies in 1965 for his research, guided by Arthur Llewellyn Basham and Johannes Gijsbertus de Casparis, on Buddhist monastic institutions in Ceylon during the early medieval period. His thesis was published by the University of Arizona Press in 1979 under the title Robe and Plough: Monasticism and Economic Interest in Early Medieval Sri Lanka.

Gunawardana was married to Viru. They had a son - Asela.

Career
Gunawardana joined the faculty of the University of Ceylon, Peradeniya in 1960 as an assistant lecturer in the Department of History. Rising up the academic ladder, he was appointed Personal Chair in History in 1982 and dean of the Faculty of Arts in 1991 before serving as vice-chancellor (1997-00) of the University of Peradeniya. He also served as chairman of the Association of Commonwealth Universities.

Gunawardana was a long-standing member of the Communist Party of Sri Lanka, having joined in 1960. He was appointed as one of the People's Alliance's National List MP in the Sri Lankan Parliament following the 2000 parliamentary election. He was appointed Minister of Science and Technology after the election. He lost his ministerial position in September 2001 following a cabinet reshuffle.

Gunawardana died on 16 November 2010 following a prolonged illness.

References

1938 births
2010 deaths
Academic staff of the University of Ceylon (Peradeniya)
Academic staff of the University of Peradeniya
Alumni of SOAS University of London
Alumni of the University of Ceylon (Peradeniya)
Cabinet ministers of Sri Lanka
Communist Party of Sri Lanka politicians
Members of the 11th Parliament of Sri Lanka
People from British Ceylon
20th-century Sri Lankan historians
Sinhalese historians
Sinhalese politicians
Sinhalese writers
Sri Lankan Buddhists
Vice-Chancellors of the University of Peradeniya
Historians of Sri Lanka